The Twentieth Wisconsin Legislature convened from  to  in regular session.

This was the first legislative session after the redistricting of the Senate and Assembly according to an act of the previous session.

Senators representing odd-numbered districts were newly elected for this session and were serving the first year of a two-year term. Assembly members were elected to a one-year term. Assembly members and odd-numbered senators were elected in the general election of November 6, 1866. Senators representing even-numbered districts were serving the second year of their two-year term, having been elected in the general election held on November 7, 1865.

Major events
 January 23, 1867: Timothy O. Howe re-elected as United States Senator by the Wisconsin Legislature in Joint Session.
 May 29, 1867: The Austro-Hungarian Compromise created the empire of Austria-Hungary.
 June 19, 1867: Emperor Maximilian I of Mexico was executed by firing squad.
 September 30, 1867: The United States took possession of Midway Atoll.
 October 18, 1867: The territory of Alaska was transferred from the Russian Empire to the United States.
 November 5, 1867: Wisconsin general election:
 Lucius Fairchild re-elected as Governor of Wisconsin.
 Voters approved an amendment to the Constitution of Wisconsin to raise legislator's compensation to $350 per year.

Major legislation
 February 13, 1867: Joint Resolution proposing the ratification of the constitutional amendment, 1867 Joint Resolution 4.  Proposed an amendment to the Constitution of Wisconsin to raise legislators' pay to $350 per year.  The amendment was ratified by voters in the November 1867 general election.

Party summary

Senate summary

Assembly summary

Sessions
 1st Regular session: January 9, 1867April 11, 1867

Leaders

Senate leadership
 President of the Senate: Wyman Spooner
 President pro tempore: George F. Wheeler

Assembly leadership
 Speaker of the Assembly: Angus Cameron

Members

Members of the Senate
Members of the Wisconsin Senate for the Twentieth Wisconsin Legislature:

Members of the Assembly
Members of the Assembly for the Twentieth Wisconsin Legislature:

Changes from the 19th Legislature
New districts for the 20th Legislature were defined in 1866 Wisconsin Act 101, passed into law in the 19th Wisconsin Legislature.

Senate redistricting

Summary of changes
 26 Senate districts were left unchanged.
 Calumet County was moved from the 19th district to the 22nd.
 Door County was moved from the 22nd district to the 2nd.
 Monroe County was moved from the 31st district to the 9th.
 Waushara County was moved from the 9th district to the 29th.
 Vernon County was moved from the 30th district to the 31st.

Senate districts

Assembly redistricting

Summary of changes
 Brown County went from having 1 district to 2.
 Buffalo County became its own assembly district, after previously having been in a shared district with Pepin and Trempealeau counties.
 Eau Claire and Pepin counties became a combined district, Eau Claire had previously been in a shared district with Chippewa and Dunn counties, Pepin had previously been in a shared district with Buffalo and Trempealeau counties.
 Dodge County went from having 5 districts to 4.
 Door and Kewaunee counties became a combined district, Door had previously been in a shared district with Oconto and Shawano counties, Kewaunee had previously been its own Assembly district.
 Fond du Lac County went from having 5 districts to 6.
 La Crosse County went from having 1 district to 2.
 Milwaukee County went from having 9 districts to 10.
 Racine County went from having 3 districts to 2.
 Rock County went from having 6 districts to 5.
 Sheboygan County went from having 4 districts to 3.
 St. Croix County became its own assembly district, after previously having been in a shared district with Pierce County.
 Trempealeau County became its own assembly district, after previously having been in a shared district with Buffalo and Pepin counties.
 Walworth County went from having 4 districts to 3.
 Washington County went from having 3 districts to 2.
 Waukesha County went from having 4 districts to 3.

Assembly districts

Notes

References

1867 in Wisconsin
Wisconsin
Wisconsin legislative sessions